Agrupación Deportiva Adra was a Spanish football team based in Adra, in the autonomous community of Andalusia. Founded in 1975, it held home games at Estadio Miramar, with a capacity of 4,000 seats.

History
Founded in 1975, Adra never played in higher than Tercera División, returning to that level for the last time in 2006. On 26 January 2011 the team withdrew from competition, due to little financial support from the administration.

Season to season

10 seasons in Tercera División

References

External links
Official website 
Futbolme team profile 

Defunct football clubs in Andalusia
Association football clubs established in 1975
Association football clubs disestablished in 2011
1975 establishments in Spain
2011 disestablishments in Spain